Greystoke may refer to:
 Greystoke, Cumbria, a village and civil parish in Cumbria, England
 Greystoke Castle in this village
 Greystoke Park, an area of Newcastle upon Tyne, England
 Greystoke Park, a modern housing development in Penrith, England
 Baron Greystoke or Greystock, an English noble title, now extinct
 Tarzan, a fictional character whose English name was said to be John Clayton, Lord Greystoke
Greystoke: The Legend of Tarzan, Lord of the Apes, a 1984 film
Tarzan Alive: A Definitive Biography of Lord Greystoke (1972), a "fictional biography" by Philip José Farmer, based on Tarzan